Wollaston Meadows is a  biological Site of Special Scientific Interest south of Wellingborough in Northamptonshire.

This site on the banks of the River Nene is composed of two species-rich hay fields. Flora include meadow foxtail, crested dog's-tail and red fescue. Overgrown hedges and ditches provide habitats for birds, small mammals and invertebrates.

The site is private land with no public access.

References

Sites of Special Scientific Interest in Northamptonshire